(also written ) was a canoe of some of Ngāi Tahu's ancestors in Māori tradition.

The canoe was conveyed to New Zealand by the north-east wind, carrying the chiefs Kirikirikatata, Aroarokaehe, Mauka Atua, Aoraki, Kakeroa, Te Horokoatu, Ritua, Ngamautaurua, Pokohiwitahi, Puketapu, Te Maro-tiri-a-te-rehu, Hikuroroa, Pahatea, Te Waioteao, and Hapekituaraki.

The canoe's fishing net and the water gourd (calabash) were turned into stone at Moeraki in the South Island, where they can still be seen in the form of the Moeraki Boulders. The canoe itself remained at Shag Point.

Dunedin's pan- marae, located in the suburb of Wakari, is named  after the canoe.

See also 

 Arahura (canoe)
 Tākitimu
 Uruaokapuarangi

References

Notes

Sources 

Māori waka
Māori mythology